Picture Music is the fourth album of electronic music by German musician Klaus Schulze. It was recorded in late 1974 and released in January 1975 on Brain Records.  In 2005 this was the second Schulze album reissued by Revisited Records. This is the only Klaus Schulze solo album in which he can be heard playing a drum kit. Prior to his solo career, he was the drummer for Ash Ra Tempel; on his later albums, drummer Harald Großkopf of Wallenstein frequently contributed. Like many of his albums, this one has one long track on each side.

Recording and release dates, and chronological order
Historically, Picture Music was incorrectly identified as Schulze's third album, allegedly preceding Blackdance (1974), based on an erroneous liner note stating it was recorded in 1973.  His first five albums were displayed in correct order on the back cover of his next album, Timewind, but his tenth album X (1978) displayed the previous albums with Picture Music explicitly identified as the third, dated 1973, implying this was the release date as well.  The same declaration was made on his twentieth album (not counting collaborations and records made under the name Richard Wahnfried), En=Trance (1988).

When preparing a detailed discography in the 1990s, Schulze's biographer and publicity manager Klaus D. Müller researched his personal diaries and discovered that the album did not go to press until early 1975.  The album is now identified as a January 1975 release at Schulze's website, which Müller maintains.  Despite the album sounding somewhere between Blackdance and Timewind, Müller concluded at the time that the album was probably recorded before Blackdance, but released after.  Later, Müller discovered that Schulze had not acquired an EMS VCS 3 synthesizer until mid 1974, so the album must have been recorded in the latter half of that year, after the recording of Blackdance.  Therefore, the official discography was revised again, and Picture Music is now regarded as Schulze's fourth album for both recording and release dates.

Cover art
Picture Music in its various editions, has more cover art designs than any other Klaus Schulze album, and another reason for confusion of release order of albums lies in the choice of original cover artist.  The first cover was a painting of an abstract man and background by Jacques Wyrs.  The previous album, Black Dance, featured a similar concept painted by Urs Amann, and in 1975, Schulze commissioned Amann to make new covers for all his previous albums, as well as his next, Timewind.  The original Wyrs cover was taken as evidence that Picture Music must precede the era of the Amann covers sequence.

Schulze did commission an Amann cover for Picture Music as well (as pictured above, showing a man bound to a ceiling), probably after the first edition of the album was released, but Brain Records did not have a reason to pay the expense of having a new cover designed (unlike his first two albums, which were originally issued under other sub-labels of Metronome Records, Brain's parent company, and then reissued on Brain with new catalogue numbers, so new covers had to be designed anyway), and rejected it.  But the Amann cover was used on a French edition on Isadora / Clementine Records (Isadora being the name on the cover, but Clementine was the name on the label).

More covers have also appeared.  A 1970s release in Belgium on Ariola Records uses a cover portrait of Schulze, framed to match the cover of a later album, Moondawn.  Brain Records issued a series of budget reissues around 1980, with new cover art designed "in house" to keep costs down by not paying royalties on cover art, and replaced the original Wyrs cover with a new design of a framed portrait of a child, balanced upright on one corner in a barren field.  In 1985, Gramavision Records in the U.S. reissued several titles from Schulze's back catalogue with new covers showing printed circuit boards superimposed over photographs of landscapes (again, an anonymous "in house" design).  The 2005 CD reissue with bonus track uses the Amann cover with his original back cover design that had never appeared before (the French album with that cover had used a blown-up detail from the front cover for the back), and also reproduced previous covers inside the CD booklet.

Track listing
All tracks composed by Klaus Schulze.

On the French LP edition on Clementine Records, side two plays first in error.  "Mental Door" is the track with drums.

Personnel
 Klaus Schulze – EMS VCS 3 synthesizer, ARP Odyssey synthesizer, ARP 2600 synthesizer, Farfisa Professional Duo organ, drums, percussion

References

Klaus Schulze albums
1975 albums